eCrew Development Program (eCDP), known unofficially as the McDonald's Training Game, is an educational video game created by McDonald's. Released for the Nintendo DS in 2010 internally within the Japanese division of McDonald's, it was only ever distributed to the company's own restaurants domestically, and never meant to be released to the public.

Gameplay 
The game teaches the player how to cook and serve various McDonald's menu items and perform other restaurant tasks, and was used to train new restaurant employees. It has several game modes, including simulations of food preparation and customer interaction. It also has quizzes, player profiles for employees and managers, and performance statistics.

History 
It was distributed in tandem with a separate game titled eSMART which aimed to train existing employees rather than new ones.  As of January 12, 2022, the Twitter account 'Forest of Illusion' preserved the game ROM of eSMART 2.0 after a fundraiser.

Development
The game had a budget of ¥200 million and was planned for use in all 3,700 McDonald's locations across Japan by the end of 2010, to which it was distributed together with a DSi (or DS lite) with an embossed McDonald's logo on the front. It is unknown to what extent it was used and for how long.

Rediscovery

A single copy of the game surfaced in September 2020 on an online auction, which was sold to American YouTuber Nick Robinson for around ¥300,000 (3,000 USD) on Yahoo Japan through Buyee. Robinson uploaded the game cartridge's ROM to the Internet Archive on 17 November 2020, alongside a documentary he produced detailing how he acquired it. The required password to enter the game was printed on the McDonald's themed DS Robinson received, however, another person working to find it (Scgoodguy), Coddy Trentuit, obtained it via inspection of the game's data in a hex editor.

On January 12, 2022, the Twitter account Forest of Illusion, an account dedicated to video game preservation, announced the archival of eSMART 2.0, obtained via a private fundraiser.

See also
 Hilton Garden Inn: Ultimate Team Play

References

External links
 The 10-Year Hunt for the Lost McDonald's DS Game
 McDonald's eCDP ROM (cartridge dump)

2010 video games
Business simulation games
Educational video games
Japan-exclusive video games
Video games developed in Japan
McDonald's video games
Nintendo DS-only games